Prospero homeobox protein 1 is a protein that in humans is encoded by the PROX1 gene. The Prox1 gene is critical for the development of multiple
tissues. Prox1 activity is necessary and sufficient to specify a lymphatic endothelial cell fate in endothelial progenitors located in the embryonic veins.

Interactions
PROX1 has been shown to interact with EP300.

Production
PROX1 is produced primarily in the dentate gyrus in the mouse, and in the dentate gyrus and white matter in humans. Gene expression data for mouse, human and macaque from the Allen Brain Atlases can be found here.

Clinical significance
PROX1 is used as a marker for lymphatic endothelium in biopsy samples.

Homologous gene
PROX2

References

Further reading

External links 
 
 

Transcription factors